Kenelm Simon Digby Wingfield Digby (13 February 1910 – 22 March 1998) was a British Conservative politician.

He was elected as member of parliament (MP) for West Dorset at a by-election in June 1941, and held the seat for over 32 years until his retirement at the February 1974 general election.

References

External links 
 

1910 births
1998 deaths
Conservative Party (UK) MPs for English constituencies
Lords of the Admiralty
UK MPs 1935–1945
UK MPs 1945–1950
UK MPs 1950–1951
UK MPs 1951–1955
UK MPs 1955–1959
UK MPs 1959–1964
UK MPs 1964–1966
UK MPs 1966–1970
UK MPs 1970–1974
Ministers in the third Churchill government, 1951–1955
Ministers in the Eden government, 1955–1957